Santiago Cepeda (Bogotá, 1986) is a Colombian poet and novelist.

He received his bachelor's degree in literature from the Pontificia Universidad Javeriana in 2010. Also in 2010, Cepeda won the Premio Nacional de Poesía Obra Inédita (National Poetry Award for Unpublished Work) with the book Arder no ha sido luz (to Burn has Not Been Light). Later that year, Cepeda obtained the first place of the Premio de Novela Joven Embajada de España-Colsanitas (Embassy of Spain-Colsanitas Young Novel Award) for the novel Revelado (Blown up). He was given a Fulbright scholarship in 2014 to do an MFA in creative writing in Spanish at NYU. He returned to Bogotá in 2015. Since then he has been working as a creative writing teacher for several universities.

Bibliography

Novels

 Revelado (Blown Up). Ed. Planeta, Colombia, 2010. .

Poetry

 "Arder no ha sido luz" ("To Burn Has Not Been Light"). Ed. Tertulia Literaria de Gloria Luz Gutiérrez, Colombia, 2011. .

Children's books

 "Deshojando" ("Defoliating"), with Jose Arboleda. Authors Edition, Colombia, 2011.

External links
Radio Interview by the HJCK 2010 (audio).
Article about the Colombian author in the Diners Magazine
A review of "To Burn has nor Been Light", by Hellman Pardo.
Santiago Cepeda's Thesis about the Figure of Silence in the works of the Peruvian Poet Jorge Eduardo Eielson.
Santiago Cepeda's Official Site.

1986 births
Living people
People from Bogotá
21st-century Colombian poets
21st-century male writers
21st-century Colombian novelists
Colombian journalists
Male journalists
Pontifical Xavierian University alumni
New York University alumni
Colombian male poets
Colombian male novelists
Fulbright alumni